Ichalkovsky District (Itsäl buje; , Ičalkoń ajmak) is an administrative and municipal district (raion), one of the twenty-two in the Republic of Mordovia, Russia. It is located in the northeast of the republic. Its administrative center is the rural locality (a selo) of Kemlya. As of the 2010 Census, the total population of the district was 20,582, with the population of Kemlya accounting for 23.5 % of that number.

Administrative and municipal status
Within the framework of administrative divisions, Ichalkovsky District is one of the twenty-two in the republic. The district is divided into fourteen selsoviets which comprise sixty rural localities. As a municipal division, the district is incorporated as Ichalkovsky Municipal District. Its fourteen selsoviets are incorporated into fourteen rural settlements within the municipal district. The selo of Kemlya serves as the administrative center of both the administrative and municipal district.

References

Notes

Sources

Districts of Mordovia
 
